jabberd2 is defunct software. It was an XMPP server, written in the C language and licensed as Free software under the GNU General Public License. It was inspired by jabberd14.

Current developers 
 Project maintainer and developer is Tomasz Sterna.

Former developers 
 The project leader was Justin Kirby.
 The project coordinator was Stephen Marquard.
 The original project creator was Rob Norris.

See also 
 Extensible Messaging and Presence Protocol
 Comparison of XMPP server software
 iChat Server

References

External links 
 jabberd2 homepage
 Why jabberd2 is not a new major release of jabberd 1.4

Instant messaging server software